Bolečka Vas is a settlement on the left bank of the Dravinja River in the Municipality of Majšperk in northeastern Slovenia. The area is part of the traditional region of Styria. It is now included with the rest of the municipality in the Drava Statistical Region.

Geography

In the valley, there are mostly fields in the meadows.

Name
Bolečka Vas was attested in written sources in 1440 as Welitschezdorff. The name is derived from the possessive adjective form of the Slavic personal name *Boľę and thus originally means 'Boľę's village'.

History and economy

Until 1998, the village  belonged to the Municipality of Videm, and later to Majšperk. It belongs to the local community of Dolena. It is the location of the F.D. Rožmarin Dolena folklore society, a womeactive, sports association, ethnographic association, folk singers, and pensioners' association. The main industries are agriculture, animal husbandry, forestry, catering, viticulture, and trucking.

References

External links
Bolečka Vas at Geopedia

Populated places in the Municipality of Majšperk